The Battle of Tudela (23 November 1808) saw an Imperial French army led by Marshal Jean Lannes attack a Spanish army under General Castaños. The battle resulted in the complete victory of the Imperial forces over their adversaries. The combat occurred near Tudela in Navarre, Spain during the Peninsular War, part of a wider conflict known as the Napoleonic Wars.

Background
Napoleon's invasion of Spain had started  with the Battle of Zornoza.
Napoleon's strategy was to make a strong attack towards Burgos splitting off the army of Blake from the others and to outflank them by then swinging both north and south.

Preliminaries
On 21 November 1808 Castaños was around Calahorra on the Ebro between Logroño and Tudela. On this day the French III Corps crossed the Ebro at Logroño and headed east towards Calahorra while at the same time Marshal Michel Ney with the VI Corps reached the Upper Douro Valley and headed towards Tudela.

These movements threatened Castaños with entrapment between these two armies. To avoid this Castaños withdrew to Tudela.

Castaños had insufficient men to hold a line of this length so he asked General Juan O'Neylle, who had two divisions at Caparroso on the east bank of the Ebro, for help. As O’Neylle was under the command of Palafox he refused to move without an order from Palafox. This did not arrive until noon on 22 November 1808. O’Neylle moved promptly to the east bank of the Ebro opposite Tudela but decided not to cross the river until the next day.

By nightfall on 22 November 1808 Castaños had almost 45,000 soldiers in the vicinity of Tudela but very few of them actually in position. Castaños placed General Manuel la Peña's 4th Division of 8,000 men, mostly Andalusians who had participated in the Battle of Bailén, at Cascante and General Grimarest at the head of three divisions totaling 13,000 to 14,000 soldiers at Tarazona. General Roca's division was on the east bank of the Ebro plus the two divisions from Aragon of O’Neylle and Felipe Augusto de Saint-Marcq.

Most of the fighting in the battle of Tudela would involve only the three divisions of Roca, O’Neylle, and Saint-Marcq – totaling about 23,000 infantry.

For the French only the III Corps was involved in the Battle of Tudela. Prior to 22 November 1808 this force had been commanded by Marshal Moncey. However, Napoleon transferred command to Marshal Jean Lannes when the advance began. This corps was just under 34,000 men consisting of four infantry divisions and three cavalry regiments. To this was added General of Division Joseph Lagrange's infantry division and General of Brigade Pierre David de Colbert-Chabanais's cavalry brigade from Ney's corps.

On the night of 22 November the French Army camped at Alfaro – 17 kilometres up the Ebro from Tudela.

Battle

On the morning of 23 November 1808 Lagrange's infantry and two cavalry brigades were sent towards Cascante. The rest of the force was sent along the Ebro towards Tudela.

At this time O’Neylle was trying to get his three divisions across the Ebro. Roca's was across first and reached its position on the right of the Spanish line just as the French attacked.

Saint-Marcq's division was second across and also took up position before the attack.

By the time O’Neylle's own division was crossing it had to fight French skirmishers who were at the top of the Cabezo Malla ridge.

The initial French attack was carried out in a piecemeal fashion by the vanguard when it was realised that the Spanish were not in position. Although this attack was repelled it showed the weakness of the Spanish positions, especially the  gap between Castaños and La Peña's force at Cascante.

The battle would ultimately be decided by La Peña and Grimarest. By noon on 23 November 1808 they had received orders to move: La Peña to close the gap at Tudela and Grimarest to Cascante. Both men failed to carry out these orders other than La Peña moving two battalions and a detachment of provincial Grenadiers to Urzante. La Peña's lack of initiative allowed the two French cavalry brigades of Colbert and General of Brigade Alexandre, vicomte Digeon to pin him in place.
 
The second French attack was made with much greater force. On the French left General of Division Antoine Morlot's division attacked Roca's division on the heights above Tudela. On the French right General of Division Maurice Mathieu's division made a frontal assault on the smaller O’Neylle division while also making outflanking moves. The attacks on both left and right were successful with both Spanish divisions being pushed off the ridges they occupied.

Then the French cavalry under General of Division Charles Lefebvre-Desnouettes charged the gap between Roca and Saint-Marcq causing the collapse of the Spanish right.

La Peña and Grimarest finally united at Cascante late in the day giving them a total of 21,000 men against Lagrange's division which was 6,000 strong plus Colbert and Digeon. After the defeat of the rest of the Spanish army however La Peña and Grimarest withdrew after dark. Their poor performance was also reflected in the casualties of only 200 on the Spanish left compared to 3,000 on the right plus 1,000 prisoners.

Casualties
Spanish casualties were estimated to be about 6,000 out of a total force of 45,000. The French, in all, lost no more than 700 dead and wounded out of a total of 35,000.

Aftermath
Napoleon's invasion of Spain proceeded with the Battle of Somosierra.

The Spanish armies of the left and right escaped from Tudela in two directions. The Aragonese forces on the right made for Zaragoza where they would assist in the Second Siege of Zaragoza starting on 20 December 1808. The virtually intact Spanish left moved towards Madrid to defend that city.

Napoleon however moved more quickly, and after defeating a small Spanish army at the Battle of Somosierra on 30 November 1808, arrived in Madrid on 1 December 1808.

Napoleon's strategy ultimately ended successfully with the occupation of Madrid.

Moore was killed at the end of the Corunna campaign starting with the Battle of Cardedeu.

The Second Portuguese campaign began with the Siege of Chaves.

In popular culture
The battle was engraved on the Arc de Triomphe in Paris.

Notes

References

Further reading
 
The first volume of Oman's classic seven volume history of the Peninsular War, this is one of the classic works of military history and provides an invaluable detailed narrative of the fighting in Spain and Portugal. This first volume covers the initial French intervention, the start of the Spanish uprising, the early British involvement in Spain and Portugal and Napoleon's own brief visit to Spain.

 
An excellent single volume history of the Peninsular War, which, when it was published, was the first really good English language history of the entire war since Oman. This is a well balanced work with detailed coverage of those campaigns conducted entirely by Spanish armies, as well as the better known British intervention in Portugal and Spain.

External links
 

Battle of Tudela
Battles involving Spain
Battles involving France
Battles involving Poland
Battles of the Peninsular War
Battle of Tudela
November 1808 events
Battles inscribed on the Arc de Triomphe